Green Hell or green hell may mean:

Green Hell (film), a 1940 adventure film directed by James Whale
"Green Hell" (song), by Misfits
The traditional north loop of the Nürburgring race track
a former description of the Amazon jungle
Green Hell (video game), a video game developed by Creepy Jar

See also

 This Green Hell (film), a 1936 British comedy film
 Last Caress/Green Hell (song), a Metallica song
 
 
 The Green Inferno (disambiguation)
 Green (disambiguation)
 Hell (disambiguation)